Artificial ruins or imitation ruins are edifice fragments built to resemble real remnants of historic buildings. 

Artificial ruins became fashionable in German interpretations of baroque and English gardens, like the Ruinenberg. The ruins are mostly of Gothic or ancient style.

See also
Folly

Ruins in Germany
Parks in Germany